Pega Pega (English title: The Big Catch) is a Brazilian telenovela created by Claudia Souto, produced and broadcast by TV Globo. It is directed by Luiz Henrique Rios. It premiered on 6 June 2017 replacing Rock Story and ended its run on 8 January 2018, with Deus Salve o Rei replacing it.

The telenovela stars Mateus Solano, Camila Queiroz, Nanda Costa, Vanessa Giácomo, Thiago Martins, Marcelo Serrado, Mariana Santos, João Baldasserini, Elizabeth Savalla, Irene Ravache and Marcos Caruso.

The plot centers the daily routine in a luxurious Carioca Palace Hotel in Rio de Janeiro and, its owner, an innocent heiress, and an ambitious businessman. All will change when a group of four friends, who are its employees, rob it and their lives are changed completely thereafter.

Plot
Set in Rio de Janeiro, in the neighbourhoods of Copacabana and Tijuca, the telenovela has as its central plot as the theft of the traditional luxurious hotel, Carioca Palace and its unfolding in the life of each one of the involved ones, be they be the guests, suspects or employees. The owner, Pedrinho Guimarães (Marcos Caruso), inherited the family hotel and never saw it as a business, but as a way to spend and squander. The playboy abused all the glamour and fell on the spree, leaving aside the administration of the hotel itself. As a consequence, the Carioca was losing its prestige and, mainly, its money. On the verge of bankruptcy, Pedrinho, intending to live in the United States in the company of his butler Nelito (Rodrigo Fagundes) and granddaughter Luíza (Camila Queiroz), sells the hotel to Eric Ribeiro (Mateus Solano), one of the most respected businessmen in Brazil, but did not mention that his granddaughter, who always lived as a hotel, fell in love with Eric and suffered quietly with the sale.

Eric, a man of integrity and one of the most successful men in the country, lost his wife in a car accident and never fell in love, despite the onslaught of his personal adviser, the clumsy and ambitious Maria Pia (Mariana Santos), who does everything for him; Eric sees her only as a good friend. The businessman is the father of the fragile and troubled teenager Bebeth (Valentina Herszage), who has suffered greatly since her mother's death, living in a totally parallel world. In addition, the girl suffers from psychotic disorder and has hallucinations with her plush kangaroo, called Flora.

The crime was conceived by the cunning concierge  Malagueta (Marcelo Serrado), who convinced the waiter Júlio (Thiago Martins), the receptionist Agnaldo (João Baldasserini) and the chambermaid Sandra Helena (Nanda Costa to execute the plan. At first they were hesitate, but then, faced with the limitations in the life of each of them, they come into an agreement to rob the hotel. The investigator of the case, the adventurous Antonia (Vanessa Giácomo), an incorruptible police officer, will have a challenge and go beyond unraveling the mystery - she will eventually fall in love with Júlio, the "repentant thief".

The criminal quartet, who can not spend the money to raise suspicions, continues to work normally at the Carioca Palace, hoping that the place will decree bankruptcy and that all will be dismissed.

However, Sandra Helena inherits half the fortune when Marieta, a lady who lives in the hotel, very affectionate with her, and with whom Sandra has a lot of affection, ends up dying, and Sandra Helena is free to spend the fortune without any suspicion.

Cast

Soundtrack 
The songs that make up Pega Pegas soundtrack were announced by UOL columnist Flávio Ricco on 23 May 2017. It was also announced that the band Skank covered "A Hard Day's Night" by The Beatles would serve as an opening theme song for the telenovela. The track was released on 2 June 2017.

Pega Pega: Volume 1

Pega Pega: Volume 2

Ratings 

The premiere of Pega Pega registered a viewership rating of 28.8 points in Greater São Paulo, a high number of viewers since Cheias de Charme (2012).

References

External links
 
 

TV Globo telenovelas
Brazilian telenovelas
Brazilian LGBT-related television shows
2017 Brazilian television series debuts
2018 Brazilian television series endings
2017 telenovelas
Gay-related television shows
Portuguese-language telenovelas
Theft in fiction
Television series set in hotels
Child abduction in television